Luke Lennox (born 28 October 1983) is an Australian actor. He started acting in 1997 on the Australian drama series Blue Heelers as a guest role. He worked on the Australian feature Angst where he played the character Mole, which was shot in and around Sydney. Luke also has worked with theatre companies in Sydney and Melbourne, and was an ensemble member of the independent Melbourne theatre company, PMD Productions. He is currently living and working in the UK. Bangladesh

Filmography 
 House Husbands - 2013
 Neighbours - 2011
 Whatever Happened to That Guy? - 2009
 Kath & Kim
 Da Kath & Kim Code – (2005)
 You and Your Stupid Mate – (2004 film)
 The Birthday Present – (2003 short film)
 MDA – (2003)
 Angst – (2000 film)
 Blue Heelers – (1997, 1998, 2000, 2003)

External links 
 

Australian male film actors
Australian male television actors
Living people
1983 births